Pomatoschistus canestrinii, Canestrini's goby, is a species of goby native to fresh and brackish waters along the Adriatic coasts where it is known to occur from the Po delta, Italy to Neretva, Croatia. It has also been introduced in Lake Trasimeno, Italy.  This species prefers areas with sand or mud substrates in lagoons, lakes and medium-sized to large-sized rivers. This species can reach a length of  TL. The specific name honours the Italian biologist Giovanni Canestrini (1835-1900).

References

Fish of Europe
Fish of the Mediterranean Sea
Pomatoschistus
Fish described in 1883
Taxonomy articles created by Polbot
Taxobox binomials not recognized by IUCN